Thindia is a genus of fungi in the family Sarcoscyphaceae. This is a monotypic genus, containing the single species Thindia cupressi, found in Uttar Pradesh, India.

References

External links
Thindia at Index Fungorum

Sarcoscyphaceae
Monotypic Ascomycota genera